Air-Sea Dolphin is a musical project by Robert Schneider of The Apples in Stereo, James Husband (James Huggins from of Montreal and Elf Power), Ryan Sterritt and The Brothers Chaps.
The group was started after Robert Schneider joined the Homestar Runner live band in 2016 as a new songwriting vehicle for his song ideas with the creative input of the Brothers Chaps & Co. to form a new group focused on 90s lo-fi 4-track recording with the addition of 8-bit style retro "video games" designed to accompany their music.

An EP is in the works to follow up their three 7” singles & the group plans a full-length LP in the near/past future depending on time/space continuum.

Discography

Singles 
 "Exploding / Spillman Was a Motorhead"(2017) 7" split single with Honey Radar

References

External links 
 Air-sea Dolphin at Discogs

Musical groups from Athens, Georgia
American indie pop groups